Ramario Xolo Maridueña (born June 9, 2001) is an American actor. His roles include Miguel Diaz in the Netflix series Cobra Kai, Victor Graham in the NBC TV series Parenthood, and Jaime Reyes / Blue Beetle in the upcoming DC Extended Universe film Blue Beetle.

Biography 
Maridueña was born in Los Angeles, California. He is of Mexican, Cuban, and Ecuadorian descent. He has four sisters.  His first professional job was modeling for a Sears catalog. He was 16 when he started acting in the series Cobra Kai. He said of his role as the Blue Beetle, as the first Hispanic superhero to star in either the Marvel or DC film universes: "The only thing that is on my mind right now is just the fact that he's Latino. I have so much pride in getting to be a part of this project... I think it's so important, and I don’t want to stand on the soapbox for too long but representation is so important."

Filmography

Film

Television

Awards

References

External links 

 

2001 births
Living people
Male actors from Los Angeles
American male actors of Mexican descent
American people of Cuban descent
American people of Ecuadorian descent
American male television actors
American male film actors
American male voice actors
American male child actors
Hispanic and Latino American male actors
21st-century American male actors